Yoon Da-hoon (born Nam Kwang-woo on February 1, 1965) is a South Korean actor. He gained popularity with the sitcom Three Friends in 2000. Yoon has since starred in television dramas such as Guardian Angel (2001), Let's Get Married (2005), Don't Worry (2005), Hyena (2006), Please Come Back, Soon-ae (2006), and Three Men (2009), as well as the films Sky Doctor (1997), A Tearful Story (2000), and Family (2002). His daughter Nam Kyung-min is also an actress.

Filmography

Television series

TV's The Art of War (KBS2, 1987)
The Winter of That Year Was Warm (KBS2, 1988)
Tomorrow Love (KBS2, 1993) (guest, episodes 10-14)
The Sorrow of the Survivor (KBS2, 1993)
Han Myung-hoe (KBS2, 1994)
Daughters of a Rich Family (KBS2, 1994)
Men of the Bath House (KBS2, 1995)
The Sweet Life (MBC, 1996)
Color (KBS2, 1996) (episode: "Red")
Project (KBS2, 1996)
Propose (KBS1, 1997)
Beautiful Her (SBS, 1997)
Because I Love You (SBS, 1997)
Bride's Room (KBS2, 1997)
Wedding Dress (KBS2, 1997)
Will Make You Happy (KBS2, 1998)
Three Kim Generation (SBS, 1998)
Now Is the Time to Love (SBS, 1999)
The Boss (MBC, 1999)
Three Friends (MBC, 2000)
Guardian Angel (SBS, 2001)
Lovers (MBC, 2001) (cameo)
Who's My Love (KBS2, 2002)
Detectives (SBS, 2003)
Let's Get Married (MBC, 2005)
Don't Worry (KBS2, 2005)
Hyena (tvN, 2006)
Please Come Back, Soon-ae (SBS, 2006)
Aeja's Older Sister, Minja (SBS, 2008)
Can Anyone Love (SBS, 2009)
Three Men (tvN, 2009)
Life Is Beautiful (SBS, 2010)
Indomitable Daughters-in-Law (MBC, 2011)
Gyebaek (MBC, 2011)
Father Is Sorry (TV Chosun, 2012)
Ji Woon-soo's Stroke of Luck (TV Chosun, 2012)
Can't Live Without You (MBC, 2012)
Childless Comfort (jTBC, 2012)
You Are the Best! (KBS2, 2013)
Steal Heart (jtBC, 2014)
Tears of Heaven (MBN, 2014)
The Invincible Lady Cha (MBC, 2015)
Persevere, Gu Hae-ra (Mnet, 2015)
My Heart Twinkle Twinkle (SBS, 2015)
Happy Home (MBC, 2016)
The Promise (KBS2, 2016)
Don't Dare to Dream (SBS, 2016)
Saimdang, Memoir of Colors (SBS, 2017)
The Miracle We Met (KBS, 2018)
The Last Empress (SBS, 2018)
My First First Love (Netflix, 2019)
Vagabond (SBS, 2019)
Love Twist (KBS2, 2021–2022)

Film
The Chameleon's Poem (1988)
Flesh Market (1989)
Korean Connection (1990)
Marijuana (1990)
섬섬옥수 (1990)
Seoul Evita (1991)
Teenage Coup d'etat (1991)
Coffee, Copy and a Bloody Nose (1994)
My Father the Bodyguard (1995)
Sky Doctor (1997)
The Rules of a Gangster 3 (2000)
Jakarta (2000)
Tearful Story (2001)
Out of Justice  (2001)
The Beauty in Dream (2002)
Family (2002)
Silver Knife (2003)
Unstoppable Marriage (2007)
The Outback (2012) (Korean dubbed)
Awaiting (short film, 2014)
 It will work this (2021)

Variety show
Live Today (SBS, 2012)
 Law of the Jungle (2017)
 Mr. House Husband 2 (2021–present)

Radio program
Radio Section with Yoon Da-hoon (MBC Standard FM, 2000-2002)

Discography
Yoon and his costars from Three Friends, Park Sang-myun and Jung Woong-in, released the Christmas album Three Friends: Carol [bird] in 2000.

References

External links

1964 births
Living people
South Korean male film actors
South Korean male television actors
South Korean male musical theatre actors
South Korean male stage actors
South Korean radio presenters